Soma Wickremanayake née Dharmawardhana (21 May 1915 - 25 May 1989) was a Ceylonese educator and socialist politician.

Early life 
Soma Dharmawardhana was born on 21 May 1915, the eldest daughter of Dr. H. D. A. Dharmawardhana, the pharmacist on the Lakshahena Estate, Deraniyagala and Chariyaratne. She had her primary school education at the government mixed school in Aluthgama and her secondary education at Ananda Sastralaya, Kotte. She taught at Kegalu Vidyalaya , Ganemulla Vidyalaya and Kolonnawa Vidyalaya. Dharmawardhana married Arthur G. Wickramanayake, an inspector with the Department of Commerce and Trade. In 1939 she joined the Lanka Sama Samaja Party, becoming the secretary of the party's Women's League.

Political career 
At the 4th parliamentary election, held on 19 March 1960, Wickramanayake ran for the seat of Dehiowita, representing the Lanka Sama Samaja Party (LSSP). The sitting LSSP member for Dehiowita, Edmund Samarakkody, choosing to run in the Kesbewa electorate instead. Wickramanayake was elected, polling 6,606 votes (37% of the total vote), only 546 votes ahead of the United National Party candidate, A. F. Wijemanne. The election results however left neither of Ceylon's two major parties with a majority, with the result being the calling of another election. She was subsequently re-elected at the 5th parliamentary election held on 20 July 1960. This time receiving 8,593 votes (50% of the total vote) and 603 votes ahead of Wijemanne. She was one of only three female representatives elected to Parliament at that time.

Wickremanayake controversially switched political allegiances from the LSSP becoming a member of the Sri Lanka Freedom Party. At the 6th parliamentary election, held on 22 March 1965, she contested the Avissawella electorate, challenging one of the LSSP's founders and the sitting member, Philip Gunawardena. She lost by 11,327 votes to Gunawardena, only securing 33% of the total vote.

Wickremanayake died on 25 May 1989, at the age of 74.

References 

1915 births
1989 deaths
Alumni of Ananda Sastralaya, Kotte
Lanka Sama Samaja Party politicians
Members of the 5th Parliament of Ceylon
Members of the 6th Parliament of Ceylon
Sinhalese politicians
Sinhalese teachers
Sri Lanka Freedom Party politicians
Women legislators in Sri Lanka